() (colloquially: Ponty) is a town and a community in Rhondda Cynon Taf, Wales.

Geography
This change was effective for the 2007 Welsh Assembly election, and for the 2010 UK General Election.

The town lies alongside the north–south dual carriageway A470 between Cardiff and Merthyr Tydfil. The A4054, running north and south of the town, was the former main road, and like the A470, follows the Taff Valley.

History

Etymology
The name  derives from the name , Welsh for "bridge by the earthen house", referring singly to successive wooden bridges that once spanned the River Taff at this point.

Old Bridge
 is noted for its Old Bridge, a stone construction across the River Taff built in 1756 by William Edwards. This was Edwards's fourth attempt, and at the time of construction, was the longest single-span stone arch bridge in the world. Notable features are the three holes of differing diameters through each end of the bridge, the purpose of which is to reduce weight. On completion, questions were soon raised as to the utility of the bridge, with the steepness of the design making it difficult to get horses and carts across. As a result, a new bridge, the Victoria Bridge, paid for by public subscription, was built adjacent to the old one in 1857.  was known as Newbridge from shortly after the construction of the Old Bridge until the 1860s.

Coal
Its role in coal transport lengthened its railway platform, which is thought to have once been the longest in the world in its heyday.  in the second half of the 19th century was a hive of industry, once nicknamed the "Wild West". There were several collieries within the Pontypridd area itself, including:

Albion Colliery, Cilfynydd
Bodwenarth Colliery, 
 Colliery,  & 
 Colliery, 
Gelli-whion Colliery, 
Great Western/ Colliery, Hopkinstown
 Colliery, Hopkinstown
Newbridge Colliery, 
 Colliery, 
/Maritime Collieries,  & 
 Colliery/'Dan's Muck Hole', 
Red Ash Colliery, 
 Colliery, Hopkinstown & 
Typica Colliery, Hopkinstown & , and
Victoria Colliery, 

Iron and steel

Buildings

Government
Pontypridd Urban District Council operated from 1894 to 1974, when it was incorporated into Taff Ely Borough Council. That in turn came under the unitary  Council in 1995.  Town Council functions as a community council. Labour is the dominant political force and has been since the First World War. The community elects 23 town councillors from 11 community wards: , Hawthorn,  Central,  Lower,  and Treforest.

Pontypridd community

 community comprises the town centre itself, with the following key villages/settlements:

 

Hawthorn (Y Ddraenen-Wen)
Hopkinstown (Trehopcyn)

Trallwn (Trallwng)
Treforest (Trefforest)
Upper Boat (Glan-Bad)
 

Transport links

Railway

However, the volumes of coal extraction soon led to construction of the Taff Vale Railway, which at its peak meant a train passed through Pontypridd railway station (including the freight lines immediately to its west) every two or three minutes. The station was originally built as a long single island, at one point the world's longest platform, a reflection of both the narrow available geography of the steep valley side and the need to accommodate many converging railways lines at what became the 19th-century hub of the valleys.

The station today is operated by Transport for Wales, which is headquartered in the town. It reflects the fewer destinations served since the Beeching and earlier cuts, with one up (valley) platform, one down (through) platform, a down bay platform (opened in December 2014), and one passing loop.

Trams, trolleybuses, and buses
A tram service began on 6 March 1905 from  through Pontypridd to Treforest. It gave way on 18 September 1930 to trolleybuses, which on 31 January 1957 were replaced by buses following the same route.

Education

 County Intermediate and Technical School was built in 1895 as a co-educational school in  Road, later becoming Pontypridd County Grammar School for Boys.
Hawthorn High School is near the A4054 in Hawthorn (south-east of the town)
Cardinal Newman RC School is on Dynea Road in Rhydyfelin.
 is on the A473 in Church Village (south of the town).
The University of South Wales is in Treforest (south of the town), next to the A473.

Entertainment and social history

Sport and recreation

It has also hosted festivals and music concerts, including the annual Ponty's Big Weekend festival.
 hosts Pontypridd Rugby Football Club, one of Wales's notable rugby union clubs, with a successful junior rugby and age-grade sections. It frequently contribute players to the national team. Formed in 1876, Pontypridd RFC play in the Principality Premiership, SWALEC Cup and the British and Irish Cup. Pontypridd RFC plays home games at Sardis Road, with its junior section playing at Taff Vale Park and Pontypridd High School Fields, Cilfynydd.
Pontypridd Town A.F.C. is a Welsh football club which currently plays in the Cymru Premier, the top tier of the Welsh football league system.
Speedway racing was staged at Taff Vale Park in the town's Broadway area in 1929/1930.
 Bowls Club plays in the top division in the  Valley, Mid Glamorgan and the Cardiff League, having been promoted in all three divisions after the 2009 season. Home games are played at  Park.

Media
 has a community radio station which broadcasts to the county of Rhondda Cynon Taf on 107.9FM. Its studios are in Rhydyfelin, near Cardinal Newman School. It offers local news and information and a wide variety of music, while providing volunteering and training opportunities. 
The  and  Observer is the local newspaper.
 has a digital media scene, with various companies having offices there.

Culture

 was home to the eccentric Dr William Price who performed the first modern cremation in the United Kingdom.
 hosted the National Eisteddfod in 1893.
 Male Voice Choir)
 holds the Welsh Poetry Competition, the biggest of its kind in Wales.
The singer Tom Jones was born in Treforest and often mentions his home town in interviews. He headlined in a 65th birthday concert at the town's  Park.

In popular culture

Twinning
The visit was returned a year later.

Notable people
In alphabetical order:
See :Category:People from Pontypridd
Robert Bye (1889–1962), recipient of the Victoria Cross in World War I
Stuart Burrows (born 1933), opera singer, born in 
Phil Campbell (born 1961) of Motörhead, Gareth Davies and Darran Smith ex-members of Funeral for a Friend
Catrin Collier (born 1948), novelist, had the  adult education centre in  named in her honour in 2002.
Alan Wayne Jones (born 1945), forensic toxicologist
David Lloyd Jones (born 1952), Judge of the High Court (QBD), Lord Justice of Appeal, and first Justice of the Supreme Court of the United Kingdom to come from Wales was educated at Pontypridd Boys' Grammar School.
Tom Jones (born 1940), singer, was born at 57 Kingsland Terrace in village of Treforest.
David Kelly (1944–2003), specialist in biological warfare, attended Pontypridd Boys' Grammar School.
Lostprophets, alternative metal band formed in 1997.
Elaine Morgan (1920–2013), scriptwriter and anthropologist
Kimberley Nixon (born 1985), actress
William Price (1800–1893) carried out the first cremation in the UK in modern times on  Common.
Chris Slade (born 1946), drummer for AC/DC and Asia
Ian Watkins, convicted sex offender and former lead singer of Lostprophets
Tasker Watkins (1918–2007), VC, Lord Justice of Appeal, deputy Lord Chief Justice, and President of the Welsh Rugby Union, was educated at Pontypridd Boys' Grammar School

Sports people
Danny Canning (1926–2014), Colin Gale (1932–2008), Richard Haig (born 1970), Ceri Hughes (born 1971), Pat Mountain (born 1976), Jason Price (born 1977) and Owain Warlow (born 1987), association footballers
Jamie Donaldson (born 1975), professional golfer 
Harri Greville (born 1990), rugby league footballer
John Gwilliam (1923–2016), Neil Jenkins (born 1971), Kevin Morgan (born 1977), Michael Owen (born 1980), Richard Parks (born 1977), Russell Robins (1932–2019), Ceri Sweeney (born 1980), Martyn Williams (born 1975) and Gareth Wyatt (born 1977), Welsh international rugby players
Sheila Laxon (living) was the first female horse trainer to win the Australian "cups double": the Caulfield Cup and Melbourne Cup.
Peter Turnbull (born 1989), first-class cricketer
Freddie Welsh (1886–1927), world champion boxer
Steve Cooper (born 1979), current Premier League manager for Nottingham Forest.

Bibliography

See also
Pontypridd (UK Parliament constituency)
Pontypridd (Senedd constituency)

References

External links

Pontypridd Town Council: official website of Pontypridd Town Council
Pontypridd Town website & forum: Official Pontypridd Town website
Ponty.net: Pontypridd Rugby Football Club's official website
GTFM: GTFM - Local Radio & local News for the Pontypridd area
British strike – extra fodder for pit ponies, Pontypridd Photo from the Library of Congress's George Grantham Bain Collection
Aerial photograph of Pontypridd
The history of Pontypridd
Pontypridd Trolleybus Pontypridd trolleybus during World War II
International Welsh Poetry Competition International Welsh Poetry Competition based in Pontypridd
Definitive guide to eating well in Pontypridd Walesonline guide to places to eat in Pontypridd
International Poetry Book Awards International Poetry Book Awards based in Pontypridd

 
Towns in Rhondda Cynon Taf